Caught by the Window is the debut album of Canadian rock band Pilot Speed (at the time known as Pilate). It was recorded at Umbrella Studios, Toronto, Ontario. The singles from the album, "Into Your Hideout" and "Melt Into the Walls", peaked at #15 and #30 on Canada's Rock chart, respectively.

Track listing
All songs by Pilot Speed, all words by Todd Clark.

References

2003 albums
Pilot Speed albums
MapleMusic Recordings albums